Mark Knowles (born 4 September 1971) is a Bahamian professional tennis coach and former professional tennis player, becoming the former number 1 in world as a specialist in doubles tennis. He won three of the four Grand Slam tournaments in men's doubles, partnering with Daniel Nestor, as well as Wimbledon in mixed doubles. At various times between 2002 and 2005 he was ranked World No. 1 in doubles. He is a five-time Olympian.

Career

Junior and college career
After being awarded a scholarship to the Nick Bollettieri's famed academy at 10 years old, Knowles played junior tennis in his early years. His best singles performance came at the 1989 Junior US Open with a quarterfinal appearance and his best doubles performance came at the 1989 Junior French Open with a final appearance partnering Luis Herrera. He reached a career-high junior ranking of No. 12. He also played three seasons at UCLA in college tennis, where he earned All-American honours in both singles and doubles before turning pro in 1992.

Junior Grand Slam results – Singles:

Australian Open: A (-)
French Open: 3R (1987)
Wimbledon: 2R (1989)
US Open: QF (1989)

Junior Grand Slam results – Doubles:

Australian Open: A (-)
French Open: F (1989)
Wimbledon: QF (1989)
US Open: SF (1988)

Professional career
Knowles's highest ATP singles ranking was world No. 96, the highest ever ranked Bahamian in history alongside Roger Smith. He was very successful in doubles, partnering Daniel Nestor, Mahesh Bhupathi. With Nestor, Knowles won the 2002 Australian Open, the 2004 US Open and the 2007 French Open. He also won the 2009 Wimbledon Mixed doubles title with Anna-Lena Grönefeld of Germany.

On 5 July 2006, Knowles and Nestor participated in one of the longest matches in Wimbledon history. Their quarterfinal match against Sweden's Simon Aspelin and Australian Todd Perry lasted 6 hours and 9 minutes, with Knowles and Nestor eventually winning 5–7, 6–3, 6–7(5–7), 6–2, 23–21.

His 13-year partnership with Daniel Nestor ended after the 2007 US Open. After reaching the Basel final with James Blake, Knowles reunited with Nestor once again to win the 2007 Tennis Masters Cup. They defeated Simon Aspelin and Julian Knowle, 6–3, 6–2, to take their first Tennis Masters Cup title.

Knowles then played with fellow Grand Slam doubles champion Mahesh Bhupathi, for two seasons in 2008 and 2009, and the two were one of the most successful teams on tour, qualifying for the season-ending championships in both years. After losing in their season debut in Sydney, Knowles and Bhupathi knocked out defending champions Bob Bryan and Mike Bryan in the quarterfinals of the Australian Open, taking the gripping match in a final set tiebreak. The two lost to eventual champions Jonathan Erlich and Andy Ram. Other season highlights included three titles, at Memphis, Dubai and Basel. The victory in Basel gave Knowles his 50th career title.

At the 2009 Australian Open, Knowles and Bhupathi went one step further than the year before, reaching the final before losing to the Bryans in three sets, after winning the first set 6–2. They went on to reach the US Open final later that year, despite the fact that Knowles was hampered by a hand injury that required eight stitches on his dominant hand (right). They also claimed their first ATP World Tour Masters 1000 crown together, winning the Rogers Cup in Montreal. They closed out their partnership at the Barclays ATP World Tour Finals, winning their round-robin group before going down in the semifinals to the Bryans. Knowles also repeated as champion in Memphis with Mardy Fish.

In 2010, Knowles joined forces with Fish, and after both struggled with injuries the first half of the season, the two captured the Legg Mason Tennis Classic in Washington, defeating Tomáš Berdych and Radek Štěpánek in the final. The two advanced to the quarterfinals of the Western & Southern Open in Cincinnati and the third round of the US Open. Knowles finished the season on a high note with a runner-up finish at the ATP World Tour Masters 1000 event in Paris with Andy Ram. The two upset top-ranked Bob Bryan and Mike Bryan in the quarterfinals.

2011 was a tough year for the Bahamian, as his season partner, Michal Mertiňák, went down with a back injury at the French Open. Prior to that, the two made semifinal appearances in San Jose and Memphis and the quarterfinals of the BNP Paribas Open at Indian Wells. After falling in the first round of Wimbledon with Łukasz Kubot, Knowles played his 10th season of World TeamTennis with the Sacramento Capitals, and then partnered Xavier Malisse to the Farmers Classic title at his former college campus, UCLA. The two edged Somdev Devvarman and Treat Conrad Huey to give the Bahamian his 54th doubles title. Knowles and Malisse also reached the quarterfinals in Washington and the third round at the US Open.

In October, Knowles was invited to participate in the 19th annual World TeamTennis Smash Hits charity event in Cleveland, co-hosted by Sir Elton John and Billie Jean King. Knowles was selected by John as a member of his team, which went on to win the exhibition 19–18. The event raised over $500,000 for various AIDS charities.

At the 2012 SAP Open, Knowles rejoined Malisse to win the ATP World Tour 250 event in San Jose, becoming the first men's player over 40 to win a tour-level doubles title since John McEnroe.

Retirement
Knowles announced his retirement at the 2012 US Open. After his announcement, many famed doubles players such as Jonas Björkman, Mahesh Bhupathi, and longtime partner Daniel Nestor all praised him. He once again partnered Malisse but lost in the first round to Pablo Andújar and Guillermo García López in three sets. However, he played one more grand slam tournament at Wimbledon in 2013 partnering Lleyton Hewitt but lost in the first round to Jamie Delgado and Matthew Ebden in straight sets where he and opponent Delgado shared the all-time male record for playing in consecutive Wimbledon tournaments, with 22 appearances in the Open era although Delgado broke the record the next year at 2014 Wimbledon with 23 appearances. After that, he played in only one tournament per year from 2014 to 2016. The first tournament was the RBC Tennis Championships of Dallas which he played in 2014 and 2015. In 2014, he partnered Ryan Harrison and made the finals but lost to top seed Sam Groth and Chris Guccione in straight sets. In 2015, he partnered Mardy Fish and defeated top seed James Cerretani and James Cluskey in the first round but lost in the next round to Hans Hach Verdugo and Luis Patiño in straight sets. The last tournament of his career was the 2016 Irving Tennis Classic where he partnered Benjamin Becker but lost in the first round to Jason Jung and Jakob Sude in straight sets.

Team Competitions
Knowles was a standout at UCLA for three years, earning All-American honors in singles and doubles before turning pro in 1991.

Representing the Bahamas, Knowles competed in five consecutive Olympic Games (1992-2008) and is his country's all-time leader in Davis Cup wins, playing in 29 ties. He received the prestigious Davis Cup Commitment Award from ITF president Francesco Ricci Bitti at the All England Club in 2014.

In World TeamTennis, Knowles was the captain of the Sacramento Capitals for 10 years, picking up three Male MVP Awards. His team won championships in 2002 and 2007.

Post career
After he finished coaching Mardy Fish, Knowles went on to coach many other top players, including top 10 player Jack Sock and top 3 player Milos Raonic. As of 2021, he is not actively coaching and is running a tennis academy in the Bahamas. He also usually plays exhibitions in the Bahamas for fundraising.

Since 2013, Knowles has worked on-air for Tennis Channel, providing in-match commentary, courtside interviews and tournament desk analysis.

Memberships
Knowles was elected by his peers as vice-president of the ATP and was selected to be on the ATP Drug Force Council.

ATP career finals

Doubles: 99 (55–44)

Doubles performance timeline

Grand Slam finals

Mixed doubles: 2 (1 title, 1 runner-up)

References

External links

 The official site for Mark Knowles|Knowlzee
 
 
 

1971 births
Living people
Australian Open (tennis) champions
Bahamian male tennis players
Bahamian people of British descent
French Open champions
Olympic tennis players of the Bahamas
Sportspeople from Nassau, Bahamas
Tennis players at the 1992 Summer Olympics
Tennis players at the 1996 Summer Olympics
Tennis players at the 2000 Summer Olympics
Tennis players at the 2004 Summer Olympics
Tennis players at the 2008 Summer Olympics
US Open (tennis) champions
Wimbledon champions
Grand Slam (tennis) champions in mixed doubles
Grand Slam (tennis) champions in men's doubles
UCLA Bruins men's tennis players
ATP number 1 ranked doubles tennis players
ITF World Champions